Montreal is an unincorporated community in southeast Camden County, Missouri, United States. It is located approximately eight miles east-southeast of Camdenton and 12 miles northwest of Richland on Route 7.

A post office called Montreal has been in operation since 1861. The community was named after Montreal, in Quebec, Canada, the native home of a share of the first settlers.

Demographics

References

Unincorporated communities in Camden County, Missouri
Unincorporated communities in Missouri